"Lovesick" / "Mirrors" is a double A-sided single released by Melbourne band The Getaway Plan on 12 August 2013.

This is the band's first fully independent release and marks The Getaway Plan's departure from their label as well as their parting ways with longtime bass player and founding member, Dave Anderson.

The songs were recorded during the 1st week of July 2013 at Loose Stones studios in Queensland, Australia.

"Lovesick" / "Mirrors" was released digitally through iTunes on 12 August 2013. The band also released a limited run of hand numbered, 7-inch vinyl which were sold on their online web store.

Track listing
All lyrics written by Matthew Wright, all music composed by The Getaway Plan

Personnel
 Matthew Wright – Lead vocals, piano, rhythm guitar
 Clint Owen Ellis – Lead guitar
 Jase Clarke – Bass guitar, vocals
 Aaron Barnett – Drums, percussion
Additional Personnel
 Chris Carmichael - Strings on "Lovesick"
 Matthew Bartlem - Producer
 Tyse Lee - Engineer
 J.R. McNeely - Mixer
 Ted Jensen - Mastering

References

2013 singles
The Getaway Plan albums